Lukolela is a town in Équateur Province in the Democratic Republic of the Congo on the Congo River bank. It is opposite the Republic of Congo town of Loukolela. The Lukolela Swamp Rat is named after the town.

References

Communities on the Congo River
Populated places in the province of Équateur
Democratic Republic of the Congo–Republic of the Congo border crossings